The 1999 Volta a Catalunya was the 79th edition of the Volta a Catalunya cycle race and was held from 17 June to 24 June 1999. The race was won by Manuel Beltrán of the Banesto team.

Teams
Fifteen teams of up to eight riders started the race:

Route

General classification

Notes

References

1999
Volta
1999 in Spanish road cycling
June 1999 sports events in Europe